Dorchester High School for Girls is a defunct four-year public high school that served students in ninth through twelfth grades, that was located in the Dorchester neighborhood of Boston, Massachusetts, United States from 1925 to 1953.

History
Dorchester High School was founded in 1852 as a co-educational institution in what was then the independent town of Dorchester, Massachusetts. In 1870, the town was annexed by the City of Boston and Dorchester High came under the jurisdiction of Boston Public Schools. A new school designed by the architectural firm of Hartwell, Richardson & Driver was built on Talbot Avenue in Codman Square and opened in 1901.  When an additional school building on Peacevale Road opened in 1925, the student body was split. Dorchester High for Boys was created and moved to the new facility, while Dorchester High for Girls was established and remained in the Codman Square building. In a Boston School Committee vote July 27, 1953, the Dorchester High School for Girls was ordered closed. The stated reasons for closure were the School Committee's desire for a co-educational school, integrating trade courses for girls, and student enrollment being under capacity. The student body was transferred to the Peacevale Road location, again establishing a co-educational Dorchester High School.

Headmasters
 James E. Thomas (1925–1929)
 Alice M. Twigg (1929–1950)
 Dorothy M. Lyons (1950–1953)

References

High schools in Boston
Educational institutions established in 1925
Educational institutions disestablished in 1953
Public high schools in Massachusetts
1925 establishments in Massachusetts
1953 disestablishments in Massachusetts
Dorchester, Boston